The Merseburg charms or Merseburg incantations are two medieval magic spells, charms or incantations, written in Old High German. They are the only known examples of Germanic pagan belief preserved in the language. They were discovered in 1841 by Georg Waitz, who found them in a theological manuscript from Fulda, written in the 9th century, although there remains some speculation about the date of the charms themselves. The manuscript (Cod. 136 f. 85a) is stored in the library of the cathedral chapter of Merseburg, hence the name.

History

The Merseburg charms are the only known surviving relics of pre-Christian, pagan poetry in Old High German literature.

The charms were recorded in the 10th century by a cleric, possibly in the abbey of Fulda, on a blank page of a liturgical book, which later passed to the library at Merseburg. The charms have thus been transmitted in Caroline minuscule on the flyleaf of a Latin sacramentary.

The spells became famous in modern times through the appreciation of Jacob Grimm, who wrote as follows:
Lying between Leipzig, Halle and Jena, the extensive library of the Cathedral Chapter of Merseburg has often been visited and made use of by scholars. All have passed over a codex which, if they chanced to take it up, appeared to offer only well-known church items, but which now, valued according to its entire content, offers a treasure such that the most famous libraries have nothing to compare with it...
The spells were published later by Jacob Grimm in On two newly-discovered poems from the German Heathen Period (1842).

The manuscript of the Merseburg charms was on display until November 2004 as part of the exhibition "Between Cathedral and World - 1000 years of the Chapter of Merseburg," at Merseburg cathedral. They were previously exhibited in 1939.

The texts
Each charm is divided into two parts: a preamble telling the story of a mythological event; and the actual spell in the form of a magic analogy (just as it was before... so shall it also be now...).
In their verse form, the spells are of a transitional type; the lines show not only traditional alliteration but also the end-rhymes introduced in the Christian verse of the 9th century.

First Merseburg Charm

The first spell is a "Lösesegen" (blessing of release), describing how a number of "Idisen" freed from their shackles warriors caught during battle. The last two lines contain the magic words "Leap forth from the fetters, escape from the foes" that are intended to release the warriors.

Second Merseburg Charm

Phol is with Wodan when Baldur's horse dislocates its foot while he is riding through the forest (holza). Wodan intones the incantation: "Bone to bone, blood to blood, limb to limb, as if they were mended".

Figures that can be clearly identified within Continental Germanic mythology are "Uuôdan" (Wodan) and "Frîia" (Frija). Depictions found on Migration Period Germanic bracteates are often viewed as Wodan (Odin) healing a horse.

Comparing Norse mythology, Wodan is well-attested as the cognate of Odin. Frija the cognate of Frigg, also identified with Freyja. Balder is Norse Baldr. Phol is possibly masculine form of Uolla, and, as Grimm suggested, the context makes it clear that it is another name for Balder. Uolla is cognate with Old Norse Fulla, a goddess there also associated with Frigg. Sunna (the personified sun) is in Norse mythology Sól. Sinthgunt is otherwise unattested.

Parallels
The First Merseburg Charm (loosening charm)'s similarity to the anecdote in Bede's Hist. Eccles.,  IV, 22 has been noted by Jacob Grimm. In this Christianized example, it is the singing of the mass, rather than the chanting of the charm, that effects the release of a comrade (in this case a brother). The unshackled man is asked "whether he had any spells about him, as are spoken of in fabulous stories", which curiously has been translated as "loosening rune (about him)" in the Anglo-Saxon translation of Bede, as has been pointed out by Sophus Bugge.  Bugge makes this reference in his edition of the Eddaic poem Grógaldr (1867), in an attempt to justify his emending the phrase "Leifnir's fire (?)" into  "loosening charm" in the context of one of the magic charms that Gróa is teaching to her son. But this is an aggressive emendation of the original text, and its validity as well as any suggestion to its ties to the Merseburg charm is subject to skepticism.

Many analogous magic incantations to the Second Merseburg Charm (horse-healing spell) have been noted. Some paralleling is discernible in other Old German spells, but analogues are particularly abundant in folkloric spells from Scandinavian countries (often preserved in so-called "black books"). Similar charms have been noted in Gaelic, Lettish and Finnish suggesting that the formula is of ancient Indo-European origin. Parallels have also been suggested with Hungarian texts. Some commentators trace the connection back to writings in ancient India.

Other Old High German and Old Saxon spells
Other spells recorded in Old High German or Old Saxon noted for similarity, such as the group of wurmsegen spells for casting out the "Nesso" worm causing the affliction. There are several manuscript recensions of this spell, and Jacob Grimm scrutinizes in particular the so-called "Contra vermes" variant, in Old Saxon from the Cod. Vindob. theol. 259 (now ÖNB Cod. 751). The title is Latin:

Contra vermes (against worms)
Gang ût, nesso,  mit nigun nessiklînon,
ût fana themo margę an that bên,  fan themo bêne an that flêsg,
ût fana themo flêsgke an thia hûd,  ût fan thera hûd an thesa strâla.
Drohtin, uuerthe so!

As Grimm explains, the spell tells the nesso worm and its nine young ones to begone, away from the marrow to bone, bone to flesh, flesh to hide (skin), and into the strâla or arrow, which is the implement into which the pest or pathogen is to be coaxed. It closes with the invocation: "Lord (Drohtin), let it be". Grimm insists that this charm, like the De hoc quod Spurihalz dicunt charm (MHG: spurhalz;  "lame") that immediately precedes it in the manuscript, is "about lame horses again"  And the "transitions from marrow to bone (or sinews), to flesh and hide, resemble phrases in the sprain-spells", i.e. the Merseburg horse-charm types.

Scandinavia

Jacob Grimm in his Deutsche Mythologie, chapter 38, listed examples of what he saw as survivals of the Merseburg charm in popular traditions of his time: from Norway a prayer to Jesus for a horse's leg injury, and two spells from Sweden, one invoking Odin (for a horse suffering from a fit or equine distemper) and another invoking Frygg for a sheep's ailment. He also quoted one Dutch charm for fixing a horse's foot, and a Scottish one for the treatment of human sprains that was still practiced in his time in the 19th century (See #Scotland below).

Norway
Grimm provided in his appendix another Norwegian horse spell, which has been translated and examined as a parallel by Thorpe. Grimm had recopied the spell from a tome by Hans Hammond, Nordiska Missions-historie (Copenhagen 1787), pp. 119–120, the spell being transcribed by Thomas von Westen c. 1714. This appears to be the same spell in English as given as a parallel by a modern commentator, though he apparently misattributes it to the 19th century. The texts and translations will be presented side-by-side below:

The number of Norwegian analogues is quite large, though many are just variations on the theme. Bishop Anton Christian Bang compiled a volume culled from Norwegian black books of charms and other sources, and classified the horse-mending spells under the opening chapter "Odin og Folebenet", strongly suggesting a relationship with the second Merseburg incantation. Bang here gives a group of 34 spells, mostly recorded in the 18th–19th century though two are assigned to the 17th (c. 1668 and 1670), and 31 of the charms are for treating horses with an injured leg.

From Bishop Bang's collection, the following is a list of specific formulas discussed as parallels in scholarly literature:
 No. 2, "Jesus og St. Peter over Bjergene red.." (c. 1668. From Lister og Mandal Amt, or the modern-day Vest-Agder. Ms. preserved at the Danish Rigsarkivet)
 No. 6, Jesus red sig tile Hede.." (c. 1714. Veø, Romsdal). Same as Grimm's LII quoted above.
 No, 20, "Jeus rei sin Faale over en Bru.." (c. 1830. Skåbu, Oppland. However Wadstein's paper does not focus the study on the base text version, but the variant Ms. B which has the "Faale" spelling)
 No. 22, "Vor Herre rei.." (c. 1847. Valle, Sætersdal. Recorded by Jørgen Moe)

It might be pointed out that none of the charms in Bang's chapter "Odin og Folebenet" actually invokes Odin. The idea that the charms have been Christianized and that the presence of Baldur has been substituted by "The Lord" or Jesus is expressed by Bang in another treatise, crediting communications with Bugge and the work of Grimm in the matter. Jacob Grimm had already pointed out the Christ-Balder identification in interpreting the Merseburg charm; Grimm seized on the idea that in the Norse language, "White Christ (hvíta Kristr)" was a common epithet, just as Balder was known as the "white Æsir-god"

Another strikingly similar "horse cure" incantation is a 20th-century sample that hails the name of the ancient 11th-century Norwegian king Olaf II of Norway. The specimen was collected in Møre, Norway, where it was presented as for use in healing a bone fracture:

This example too has been commented as corresponding to the second Merseburg Charm, with Othin being replaced by Saint Olav.

Sweden
Several Swedish analogues were given by Sophus Bugge and by Viktor Rydberg in writings published around the same time (1889). The following 17th-century spell was noted as a parallel to the Merseburg horse charm by both of them:

Another example (from Kungelf's Dombok, 1629) was originally printed by Arcadius:

A spell beginning "S(anc)te Pär och wår Herre de wandrade på en wäg (from Sunnerbo hundred, Småland 1746) was given originally by Johan Nordlander.

A very salient example, though contemporary to Bugge's time, is one that invokes Odin's name:

(from Jellundtofte socken, Västbo hundred in Småland, 19th century)

Denmark
A Danish parallel noted by A. Kuhn is the following:

Scotland
Grimm also exemplified a Scottish charm (for people, not horses) as a salient remnant of the Merseburg type of charm. This healing spell for humans was practiced in Shetland (which has strong Scandinavian ties and where the Norn language used to be spoken). The practice involved tying a "wresting thread" of black wool with nine knots around the sprained leg of a person, and in an inaudible voice pronouncing the following:

Alexander Macbain (who also supplies a presumably reconstructed Gaelic "Chaidh Criosd a mach/Air maduinn mhoich" to the first couplet of "The Lord rade" charm above) also records a version of a horse spell which was chanted while "at the same time tying a worsted thread on the injured limb".

Macbain goes on to quote another Gaelic horse spell, one beginning "Chaidh Brìde mach.." from Cuairtear nan Gleann (July 1842) that invokes St. Bride as a "he" rather than "she", plus additional examples suffering from corrupted text.

Ancient India
There have been repeated suggestions that healing formula of the Second Merseburg Charm may well have deep Indo-European roots. A parallel has been drawn between this charm and an example in Vedic literature, an incantation from the 2nd millennium BCE found in the Atharvaveda, hymn IV, 12:

This parallelism was first observed by Adalbert Kuhn, who attributed it to a common Indo-European origin. This idea of an origin from a common prototype is accepted by most scholars, although some have argued that these similarities are accidental.

The Rohani (Rōhaṇī ) here apparently does not signify a deity, but rather a healing herb; in fact, just an alternative name for the herb arundathi mentioned in the same strain.

See also
Eggja stone
Lorsch Bee Blessing
Nine Herbs Charm

Explanatory notes

Citations

References

Editions
 

The Merseburg Charms
  
 

  (reprint)

 
 

General

, p. 287, 549- (addendum to p. 284ff)

 

 
 (in: "Cap. XXXVIII. Sprüche und Segen"; "Beschwörungen")

Hoptman, Ari (1999). "The Second Merseburg Charm: A Bibliographic Survey." Interdisciplinary Journal for Germanic Linguistics and Semiotic Analysis 4: 83–154.

 Cont. in: The Highland Monthly 4 (1892-3), pp. 227–444 

 Cont. in:  Transactions 18 (1891-2), pp. 97–182
 (discusses Rydberg and Bugge's commentary)
 
  (Reprint)
(Revised version; containing  and his Anglo-Saxon Trial by Jury (2000))

Germanic mythology
Germanic paganism
Merseburg
Old High German literature
Sources on Germanic paganism
Incantation
Medieval documents of Germany